Al-Maniya (also spelled al-Minya) is a Palestinian village in the Bethlehem Governorate in the central West Bank, 8.6 km southeast of Bethlehem and just south of Tuqu'. It incorporates the nearby hamlet of Wadi Muhammad within its jurisdiction. Most of the village, including much of its built-up area, is in Area C, giving the Israeli military full control over the village. It had a population of 1,012 in the 2007 census by the Palestinian Central Bureau of Statistics.

History
The village was founded by immigrants from the southern town of Sa'ir near Hebron. According to local legend, its name derives from a cave in the vicinity that inhabited by a Byzantine-era queen named "Maniya." There is one mosque, the Palestine Mosque, in the village.

French explorer Victor Guérin passed by  the place in 1863, and described it as having ruins "of little importance."  In 1883, PEF's Survey of Western Palestine, it was  described  as having "foundations and ruined walls, with one or two  caves, which are inhabited."

In 1996, the Palestinian National Authority (PNA) established a seven-member village council to administer al-Maniya. The council members are appointed by the PNA. Principal families include al-Jabarin, al-Frookh, al-Kawazba, at-Tarwa and ash-Shalalda.

References

Bibliography

External links
 Welcome to Kh. al-Minya
Survey of Western Palestine, Map 21:    IAA, Wikimedia commons
Al Maniya village (fact sheet), Applied Research Institute–Jerusalem (ARIJ)
Al Maniya Village Profile, ARIJ
Al Maniya, aerial photo, ARIJ
The priorities and needs for development in Al Maniya village based on the community and local authorities’ assessment, ARIJ

Bethlehem Governorate
Villages in the West Bank
Municipalities of the State of Palestine